Siege of Coria may refer to:
Siege of Coria (1138)
Siege of Coria (1142)